Kantara is a village in the Famagusta District of Cyprus, located south-west of Kantara Castle. It is under the de facto control of Northern Cyprus.

References

Populated places in Famagusta District